Paul Kilderry and Pavel Vízner were the defending champions, but Kilderry did not compete this year. Vízner teamed up with Martin Damm and lost in semifinals to tournament winners Jacco Eltingh and Paul Haarhuis.

Jacco Eltingh and Paul Haarhuis won the title by defeating Trevor Kronemann and David Macpherson 6–4, 7–5 in the final.

Seeds

Draw

Draw

References

 Official results archive (ATP)
 Official results archive (ITF)

Rosmalen Grass Court Championships
1997 ATP Tour